Flight 143 may refer to: 
 Air Canada Flight 143, which became known as the "Gimli Glider" after it landed at Gimli Air Force Base on July 22, 1983, having glided 80 miles after running out of fuel
 Philippine Airlines Flight 143, which exploded prior to take-off on May 11, 1990 at Manila Airport, killing 8 passengers

0143